The Coroner's Lunch is a crime novel by British author Colin Cotterill first published in 2004. It is the first instalment in the Dr. Siri Paiboun series, set in the Lao People's Democratic Republic during the 1970s.

Plot summary
Despite a total lack of training, an utter dearth of experience and a complete absence of inclination, Dr. Siri Paiboun has just been appointed state coroner for the Lao People's Democratic Republic.  It's 1976, the royal family has been deposed, the professional classes have fled and the communists have taken over.  And 72-year-old Siri - a communist for convenience and a wry old reprobate by nature - has got the coroner's job because he's the only doctor left in Laos.

But when the wife of a Party leader is wheeled into the morgue and the bodies of tortured Vietnamese soldiers start bobbing to the surface of a Laotian lake, all eyes turn to the new coroner.  Faced with official cover-ups and an emerging international crisis, Siri will be forced to enlist old friends, tribal shamans, forensic deduction, spiritual acumen and some good old-fashioned sleuthing before he can discover quite what's going on...

References

External links
American Booksellers Association: The Coroner's Lunch Interview
Euro Crime: The Coroner's Lunch review

2004 British novels
British crime novels
English novels
Novels set in Laos
Fiction set in 1976
Soho Press books